FORDISC is a software program created by Stephen Ousley and Richard Jantz. It is designed to help forensic anthropologists investigate the identity of a deceased person by providing estimates of the person's size, ethnicity, and biological sex based on the osteological material recovered.

Features 
FORDISC can estimate the sex, ancestry, and stature of a given skeleton via linear discriminant analysis of standard anthropometric measurements. Although created for use in forensic anthropology, many physical anthropologists are still using the program to determine the biological profile of skeletal remains that are considered archaeological in origin. However, the results acquired from such remains may be skewed, as FORDISC is primarily designed for modern populations, which may differ in some factors from historic ones. The use of discriminant function analysis in FORDISC allows the user to sort individuals into specific groups that are defined by certain criteria. The discriminate function analysis "analyzes specific groups with known membership in discrete categories such as ancestry, language, sex, tribe or ancestry, and provides a basis for the classification of new individuals with unknown group membership." FORDISC compares potential profiles to data contained in a database of skeletal measurements of modern humans.

Databases 
The data behind FORDISC largely originated from the Forensic Data Bank, which is contributed to by the University of Tennessee and other contributing institutions. The Forensic Data Bank was created in 1986, through the use of a National Institute of Justice grant, and has gathered over 3400 cases. The Forensic Data Bank is a currently ongoing effort to record information about modern populations, primarily from forensic cases.

FORDISC's creators have also integrated  W. W. Howells worldwide cranial data into the program, for the use of archaeological remains. Howell's craniometric data set consist of 2500 crania from 28 different populations around the world dating to the later Holocene, in which around 82 cranial measurements were obtained.

Criticism 
According to the authors of the program, some limitations should be taken into account when using this program. Some of these limitations include the fact that FORDISC will classify any unknown into the ‘closest’ group, this means that even if an individual's ethnic group or race is not represented in the database, the program will classify it to the ‘closest’ group. Another limitation involves classification using hybrid individuals and groups. The authors state that genetic exchange between groups can cause misclassifications due to gene overlap that can consist of two ancestral populations. Another limitation deal with the classification of individuals under the age of 18, this is due to the nature of physical anthropologists ability to assess age in subadults. However, the authors state that there are differences between subadults in different groups, but these differences tend to not correspond to differences seen in adults. Another limitation that the authors believe researchers should take into account is the fact that this program is based on measurements that are affected by "disease, disuse, treatment, or trauma." The measurement of affected  may produce inaccurate values, and therefore he classification will not reflect the correct population affinity.

The last limitation deals with archaeological populations. This limitation is because most of the measurements in the data set that the classifications are based on in the program are from remains that are from the 20th century, and should not be used for classification of archaeological remains. This is because documented population differences and secular changes that have occurred throughout history. However, the inclusion of W. W. Howells craniometric data set has allowed researchers to classify archaeological remains because much of the data set comes from individuals from the 19th century.

A 2009 study found that even in favourable circumstances, FORDISC 3.0 can be expected to classify no more than 1 per cent of specimens with confidence." In 2012 research presented at the 81st Annual Meeting of the American Association of Physical Anthropologists concluded that FORDISC ancestry determination was not always consistent, that the program does not perform to expectations and that it should be used with caution.
  
In 2012 research was presented at the 81st Annual Meeting of the American Association of Physical Anthropologists, which concluded FORDISC ancestry determination was not always consistent, and the programs' recommended acceptance criteria did not separate correct and incorrect determinations. The authors concluded that the program does not perform to expectations and should be used with caution.

List of Contributing Institutions to the Forensic Anthropology Data Bank 
 Appalachian State University
 C.A. Pound Human Identification Laboratory
 California State University, Chico
 College of Mt. Joseph
 Colorado College
 Faculty of Dentistry, University of São Paulo
 Hamilton County Medical Examiner's Office, Chattanooga, Tennessee
 Hamline University
 Honolulu Medical Examiner's Office
 Louisiana State University
 Lucas County Coroner's Office
 Mercyhurst Archaeological Institute
 Monterey County Sheriff's Department
 New Jersey State Police, Criminal Investigation Bureau
 North Dakota Medical Examiner
 North Carolina Medical Examiners Office, Chapel Hill
 Office of the Medical Examiner, Nashville, Tennessee
 Regional Forensic Center, Memphis, Tennessee
 Smithsonian Institution
 Southwest Texas State University
 Texas Tech University
 U.L.M.
 U.S. Army Central Identification Laboratory
 University of Alabama
 University of Arizona
 University of Arkansas, Fayetteville
 University of California, Santa Cruz
 University of Hawaii
 University of Indianapolis
 University of New Mexico
 University of South Carolina
 University of South Florida
 University of Utah
 University of Wyoming
 Western Michigan University
 Wichita State University

See also 
 Forensic anthropology
 Biological anthropology
 Bioarchaeology
 Cranid
 Osteoware

References

Further reading 
 Williams, Frank L'Engle. Robert L. Belcher, and George J. Armelagos. "Forensic Misclassification of Ancient Nubian Crania: Implications for Assumptions about Human Variation." Current Anthropology, Vol.46, No. 2 (April 2005), pp. 340–346.

External links
 FORDISC website
 FORDISC 3.1 Support
 Forensic Anthropology Data Bank
 The William W. Howell's Craniometric Data Set

Anthropology
Forensic software